South Balochistan  is a proposed new province of Pakistan, comprising the areas Makran and Lasbela in the southern part of Balochistan province. Made up of Makran Division and Kalat Division (some district of Kalat division), the proposed South Balochistan forms about 42 percent of the total area and 32 percent of the population of Balochistan province.

Division 

 Khuzdar
 Lasbela
 Makran

District 

 Awaran District 
 Dasht District (Proposed District)

 Gwadar District 
 Hub District 

 Kech District 
 Khuzdar District (except Moola & Zehri tehsil) 
 Lasbela District 
 Ormara District (Proposed District)

 Punjgur District 
 Wadh District (Proposed District)

References 

Balochistan